Dassehra is a 2018 Indian Hindi-language action thriller film directed by Manish Vatsalya and produced by Aparna Hoshing. It stars Neil Nitin Mukesh, Tina Desai and Manish Vatsalya, with a screenplay by Saurabh Choudhary. The film was released in India on 26 October 2018.

Plot 
Honest IPS officer Aditi Singh (Tina Desai) and hard-boiled cop Rudra (Neil Nitin Mukesh) investigate a multiple suicide case. They stumble upon a darker truth revolving around the corrupt politician Yadav (Govind Namdeo) and Shankar (Manish Vatsalya). The political nexus forces Rudra to become the angry-young-man and one-man-army all rolled into one.

Cast 
Neil Nitin Mukesh as DSP Rudra Pratap Singh Chauhan IPS
Tina Desai as SP Aditi Rudrapratap Singh IPS
Govind Namdeo as Chief Minister Prasadi Lal
Manish Vatsalya as Shankar Yadav
Sharat Saxena as DGP N.K.Sharma IPS
Arya Babbar as Inspector Honey Singh
Pragya Maheshwari as Inspector Anjana Singh
Swati Bakshi as Sarika Kashyap 
Murali Sharma as SI Dulare
Yana Gupta as an item number "Joganiya"
Scarlett Mellish Wilson as an item number "Maee Re"

Production

Soundtrack

The album is composed by Vijay Verma and Siddhant Madhav while the lyrics penned by Rajesh Mànthan.

Reception

References

External links 
 
 

2010s Hindi-language films
Indian action thriller films
Indian police films
2000s masala films
2018 action thriller films
2010s police films